WIRI (105.5 MHz) is an FM radio station broadcasting a classic country music format. Licensed to Nekoosa, Wisconsin, United States, the station serves the Central Wisconsin area. The station is currently owned by Civic Media LLC.

History

The station went on the air as KZZA on July 22, 2003. Three days later, the station changed its call sign to WUSP, and on March 5, 2008, to WRCW. The call sign became WLJY on September 16, 2013. with the format change from oldies as "Kool Gold 105.5" to an adult contemporary format as "Y105.5". WLJY became WIRI on May 1, 2021.

On June 23, 2021, WIRI flipped to classic country as "Country Legends 24/7".

On August 3, 2022, It was announced that Civic Media will acquire WIRI.

References

External links

IRI
Radio stations established in 2003
2003 establishments in Wisconsin
Classic country radio stations in the United States